The 1984 Portuguese Grand Prix was a Formula One motor race held at Estoril on 21 October 1984. It was the sixteenth and final race of the 1984 FIA Formula One World Championship. It was the first World Championship Portuguese Grand Prix since 1960, when it was held at the Boavista street circuit in Oporto.

Niki Lauda needed second place to secure the title, and gained it when Nigel Mansell spun out with 18 laps to go. As a result, he took the title by just half a point from team-mate Alain Prost. The point-scoring drivers won a total of 13 world championships between them, and the three drivers on the podium were all (at least) triple World Champions from different eras – Lauda, approaching the end of his long and distinguished F1 career, Prost, enjoying the best years of his career, and Ayrton Senna, still at the dawn of his.

After running a strong second behind Prost for most of the race, Mansell's spin on lap 52 was due to his front left brake failing.

The race also represented the last win for French tyre manufacturer Michelin in Formula One until the 2001 San Marino Grand Prix.

Classification

Qualifying

Race

Championship standings after the race

Drivers' Championship standings

Constructors' Championship standings

Note: Only the top five positions are included for both sets of standings.

References

Portuguese Grand Prix
Grand Prix
Portuguese Grand Prix
Portuguese Grand Prix